Amory is a city in Monroe County, Mississippi. The population was 7,316 at the 2010 census. Located in the northeastern part of the state near the Alabama border, it was founded in 1887 as a railroad town by the Kansas City, Memphis and Birmingham Railroad. As a result, Cotton Gin Port, along the Tombigbee River to the east, was abandoned as businesses and people moved for railroad access.

History
Amory was founded as a planned railroad town. The Kansas City, Memphis & Birmingham Railroad was expanding in the South and needed a midpoint between Memphis, Tennessee, and Birmingham, Alabama, to service their locomotives. They laid out the new town of Amory, Mississippi, near the Alabama border, in 1887.

Believing railroad access to be critical, people from nearby Cotton Gin Port, about 1.5 miles away and located along the Tombigbee River, abandoned their town and moved to Amory. All that remains of the former Cotton Gin Port are the ruins of buildings and an old cemetery.

Two field recordings were made at Monroe County Training School in Amory.

Geography

Demographics

2020 census

As of the 2020 United States Census, there were 6,666 people, 2,900 households, and 1,666 families residing in the city.

2010 census
As of the 2010 United States Census, there were 7,316 people living in the city. 69.5% were White, 29.0% African American, 0.2% Native American, 0.2% Asian, 0.3% from some other race and 0.7% of two or more races. 1.4% were Hispanic or Latino of any race.

2000 census
As of the census of 2000, there were 6,956 people, 2,876 households, and 1,903 families living in the city. The population density was 927.2 people per square mile (358.1/km2). There were 3,147 housing units at an average density of 419.5 per square mile (162.0/km2). The racial makeup of the city was 69.85% White, 29.18% African American, 0.12% Native American, 0.06% Asian, 0.16% from other races, and 0.63% from two or more races. Hispanic or Latino of any race were 0.79% of the population.

There were 2,876 households, out of which 30.6% had children under the age of 18 living with them, 43.8% were married couples living together, 19.3% had a female householder with no husband present, and 33.8% were non-families. 31.7% of all households were made up of individuals, and 15.7% had someone living alone who was 65 years of age or older. The average household size was 2.36 and the average family size was 2.97.

In the city, the population was spread out, with 25.9% under the age of 18, 8.0% from 18 to 24, 25.0% from 25 to 44, 22.5% from 45 to 64, and 18.7% who were 65 years of age or older. The median age was 38 years. For every 100 females, there were 82.4 males. For every 100 females age 18 and over, there were 75.3 males.

The median income for a household in the city was $28,789, and the median income for a family was $37,891. Males had a median income of $30,913 versus $21,356 for females. The per capita income for the city was $14,092. About 17.1% of families and 20.7% of the population were below the poverty line, including 31.6% of those under age 18 and 17.4% of those age 65 or over.

Economy
Gilmore Memorial Hospital is well regarded as having one of the better maternity wards in northeast Mississippi. Other business sectors include sports equipment manufacturing, wood pulp processing, and the furniture and textile industries.

Arts and culture
In honor of its cultural and historical heritage, the city of Amory holds the annual "Railroad Festival" in April in Frisco Park in downtown. Among other attractions, the Festival includes southern foods—such as fried catfish, barbecue, and apple fritters— rides, arts and crafts, and live music, most notably the local band The Gents who have brought fans out for years with their Motown, Blues Brothers, and classic oldies show. While spring rains are possible during the 3-day festival, turnout is generally quite large, with as many as 40,000 visiting the festival over the period of a weekend.

In addition to the annual Railroad Festival, Amory held "Entertainment for Education", also known as "Stars Over Mississippi", an event in which a number of celebrities and entertainers hosted a benefit concert to raise funds for local scholarships. Past performers and attendees included Vince Gill, Dolly Parton, Nell Carter, Sandi Patty, Kathie Lee Gifford, Kathy Ireland, Brad Paisley, Brooks and Dunn, Ray Romano, Tony Danza, Patricia Heaton, Doris Roberts, Whoopi Goldberg, Brad Garrett, and Prince Edward.

Education
Most of Amory is served by the Amory School District, while a small portion is served by the Monroe County School District.

Amory Christian Academy is a private school also located in Amory, MS.

Infrastructure

Transportation
Road transport is served by US 278, Mississippi Highway 6, and Mississippi Highway 25. Rail transport is offered by BNSF Railway, the Alabama and Gulf Coast Railway, and the Mississippian Railway. Ship transport can be accommodated on the Tennessee-Tombigbee Waterway.

Notable people

 Lucille Bogan, classic female blues singer
 Lt. Col. Herman Carter, one of the original 33 Tuskegee Airmen
 John Dye, actor known for his role of Andrew on Touched by an Angel 
 Rufus French, All-American football player
 Gary Grubbs, actor
 Butch Thompson, head baseball coach, Auburn University
 Will Hall, head football coach, University of Southern Mississippi ; previously offensive coordinator, University of Louisiana Lafayette and head coach at University of West Alabama
 Trent Harmon, winner of American Idol Season 15
 Ulysses Hollimon, Negro league baseball player
 Brian Maxcy, pitcher for Detroit Tigers
 Mitch Moreland, first baseman and right fielder for Texas Rangers, Boston Red Sox and Oakland Athletics

In popular culture
 "Blue Suede Shoes" was written by Carl Perkins during a trip to Amory, for a concert with Elvis Presley and Johnny Cash in 1955.

See also
 Amory Lock on the Tennessee-Tombigbee Waterway
 Cotton Gin Port
 St. Louis-San Francisco Railway
 Mississippian Railway
 Alabama and Gulf Coast Railway

References

External links

 City of Amory, Mississippi
 Park Hotel in Amory Ledgers (MUM00354) at the University of Mississippi, Archives and Special Collections.

Cities in Mississippi
Cities in Monroe County, Mississippi